A zero marker is a null morpheme being used as linguistic marker, see:
 Zero (linguistics)
 Zero-marking language
 Zero-marking in English

Zero marker is not to be confused with Kilometre zero, frequently represented by a ceremonial marker.

See also 
 Zero copula